Under Blackpool Lights is the first official DVD released by The White Stripes. The DVD consists of 26 tracks recorded at The Empress Ballroom at the Winter Gardens in the English seaside resort of Blackpool on January 27 and 28, 2004, and directed by Dick Carruthers using super 8 film. Among these tracks, as with most White Stripes live performances, are several cover songs – such as "Take a Whiff on Me" (Lead Belly), "Outlaw Blues" (Bob Dylan), "Jack the Ripper" (Screaming Lord Sutch), "Jolene" (Dolly Parton), "Death Letter" (Son House), "Goin' Back to Memphis" (Soledad Brothers), and "De Ballit of de Boll Weevil" (Lead Belly).

The DVD's title comes from a moment during the performance in which Jack White addresses the audience:

Track listing
 "When I Hear My Name"
 "Black Math"
 "Dead Leaves and the Dirty Ground"
 "I Think I Smell a Rat"
 "Take a Whiff on Me" (and part of "Cannon")
 "Astro"
 "Outlaw Blues"
 "Jack the Ripper"
 "Jolene"
 "Hotel Yorba"
 "Death Letter"/"Grinnin' In Your Face"
 "Do"
 "The Hardest Button to Button"
 "Truth Doesn't Make a Noise"
 "The Big Three Killed My Baby"
 "Wasting My Time"
 "You're Pretty Good Looking (For a Girl)"
 "Hello Operator"
 "Apple Blossom"
 "Ball and Biscuit"
 "Let's Shake Hands"
 "I Fought Piranhas"
 "Let's Build a Home"
 "Goin' Back to Memphis"
 "Seven Nation Army"
 "De Ballit of de Boll Weevil"

Personnel
Jack White – vocals, guitar, piano
Meg White – drums

References

External links
 Setlists from January 27 and January 28, 2004.

The White Stripes albums
Blackpool
2004 live albums
2004 video albums
Live video albums
Albums produced by Jack White